Wolseley is a small town in the upper Breede River Valley region of the Western Cape province of South Africa. In the 2011 Census it had a population of 1,528 people.

Geography

Government
Wolseley is divided between wards 2 and 7 of the Witzenberg Local Municipality, which has its headquarters at Ceres.

Transport
Wolseley is located just off the R46 regional route, which runs north to Tulbagh and the Nuwekloof Pass to the Swartland, and east over Michell's Pass to Ceres. The R43 regional route begins nearby at a junction with the R46, and runs south to the N1 national route at Worcester. The R43 also connects to the R301 over Bain's Kloof Pass to Wellington.

It is also situated on the main railway line from Cape Town to the interior. Wolseley railway station is served by Metrorail's "Boland Blitz" service, with one train per day in the morning from Worcester to Cape Town, and one in the evening in the other direction. Wolseley is also the junction for the now-closed branch line to Ceres.

In popular culture
In the novel Wolseley (2014) by South African author John J le Grange, the town is home to the family of three who travel to Cape Town looking for a better fortune, as well as being the title to the book.

References

External links

 Wolseley at Western Cape Tourism

Populated places in the Witzenberg Local Municipality